Phellinus weirii is a plant pathogen causing laminated root rot in certain conifers, typically Douglas-fir and western redcedar.  It is widespread in the Douglas-fir growing regions of British Columbia, Washington and Oregon.

Overview
Symptoms of fungal infection are readily recognized when timber is cut because a brown stain will appear on the butt cut. In early stages it will be just a spot in the heart wood, but as the disease advances it will extend most of the way around the heart wood, and in extreme cases may result in a hollow stump.   Usually it is not observed more than a few feet above ground level.

Losses due to the fungus are estimated at 4.4 million m3 (157 million ft3) of timber in the Northwestern United States and in British Columbia.

Reduced growth rate is an attribute of tree infection.  Particular attention is invited to the growth ring patterns visible in the images attached.

References

Fungal conifer pathogens and diseases
weirii
Fungi described in 1914
Fungi of North America
Taxa named by William Alphonso Murrill